Tachina taenionota is a species of fly in the genus Tachina of the family Tachinidae that is endemic to Germany.

References

Insects described in 1830
Diptera of Europe
Endemic fauna of Germany
taenionota